Minnesota State Highway 253 (MN 253) was a  highway in south-central Minnesota, which ran from its intersection with Faribault County State-Aid Highway 2 in the city of Bricelyn and continued north to its northern terminus at its interchange with Interstate 90 in Brush Creek Township.

In 2019, the route was marked as Faribault County State-Aid Highway 23.

Route description
Highway 253 served as a short north–south connector route in south-central Minnesota between the city of Bricelyn and Interstate 90.

At its northern terminus interchange with I-90, Highway 253 was located on the edge of the Walnut Lake Wildlife Management Area.

The route was legally defined as Route 253 in the Minnesota Statutes.

History
Highway 253 was authorized on July 1, 1949.

The route was paved at the time it was marked.

On October 1, 2019, the state transferred ownership to Faribault County and the road is no longer part of the state highway system.

Major intersections

References

External links

Highway 253 at the Unofficial Minnesota Highways Page

253
Transportation in Faribault County, Minnesota